In volcanology, deformation is any change in the shape of a volcano or the land surrounding it. This can be in the form of inflation, which is a response to pressurization, or deflation, which is a response to depressurization. Inflation is represented by swelling of the ground surface, a volcanic edifice, or a subsurface magma body. It can be caused by magma accumulation, exsolution of volatiles, geothermal processes, heating, and tectonic compression. Deflation is represented by shrinking of the ground surface, a volcanic edifice, or a subsurface magma body. It can be caused by magma withdrawal (related to intrusion or eruption), volatile escape, thermal contraction, phase changes during crystallization, and tectonic extension. Deformation is a key indicator of pre-eruptive unrest at many active volcanoes. The term bradyseism is used in the volcanological literature to mean the vertical ground movements associated with the Phlegraean Fields volcanic area west of Naples, Italy.

Ground deformation measurements are crucial in volcano monitoring as they provide an important indicator about what is happening beneath a volcano. As magma accumulates in an underground reservoir before an eruption, the ground surface typically undergoes inflation. If silicic magma intrudes very near the surface but does not breach to the surface, it may form a bulge on the surface known as a cryptodome. Although deformation is frequently related to subsurface magmatic movements, other processes may contribute as well. This is particularly true for subglacial volcanoes, which may undergo inflation or deflation due to size variations of the overlying ice cap. An example of this phenomenon has been demonstrated for Katla, an active volcano under Mýrdalsjökull in the south of Iceland.

GPS, tilt and InSAR are the primary methods used to track ground movement. GPS measurements can be used to estimate the location and amount of magma accumulating beneath the surface. For example, the Hawaiian volcano Mauna Loa has experienced multiple episodes of inflation since its 1984 eruption, and it has been well documented since the mid-1990s. Ground tilt is continuously recorded with electronic tiltmeters installed in drill holes about  beneath the ground surface—a location that insulates the instruments from the effects of environmental (temperature and wind) and cultural noise. Rapid changes in tilt are usually detected in the hours to days before an intrusion or eruption. InSAR uses radar images of the ground that are collected by airplanes or orbiting satellites to make maps of ground deformation. The Group on Earth Observations' "Supersite" initiative identified Hawaii as a critical site for regular monitoring, so more satellite InSAR data are available for Kīlauea and Mauna Loa volcanoes than for any other volcano on Earth. Because InSAR detects deformation over broad areas, it is an excellent tool for mapping both large- and small-scale changes.

References

Volcanology
Volcano monitoring